Marie Key Kristiansen better known as Marie Key is a Danish pop singer and songwriter.  Marie released a successful debut single "Se nu herhen" ('Look over here') taken from her debut album I byen igen ('In the town again').  With her second solo album De her dage ('These days'), Marie became an even bigger commercial success, reaching No. 1 on the Danish Album Charts.

Since 2002, Marie has worked with a number of musicians, firstly with her band called the Marie Key Band.  Based in Copenhagen, the band included Marie Key (lead vocals, guitar and songwriter),  Jakob Thorkild (guitar), Marie Louise von Bülow (double bass and backing vocals) and Mads Andersen (drummer and backing vocals). Their genre was considered 'urban pop' and their biggest hit was "KarriereKanonen 2005".

Discography

Albums
as Marie Key Band
2006: Udtales ['kæj]
2008: EP
2008: Hver sin vej

Solo

Singles

Featured in

References

External links
Official website
YouTube

1979 births
Living people
20th-century Danish women singers
Danish women singer-songwriters
Danish LGBT singers
Danish LGBT songwriters
21st-century Danish women singers